Mark von Schlegell is an American science fiction writer and cultural critic. He lives in Germany and the U.S. His novels include Venusia (2005), which was honors listed for the James Tiptree, Jr. Award, Mercury Station (2009) and Sundogz (2015).

He works regularly as an international art writer. Projects from recent years include writing The Lepidopters (2012–14), a comic book/rock opera originating in Yogyakarta, Indonesia, co-curating the exhibition Dystopia at the CAPC Bordeaux in 2011, and scripting the Ben Rivers film Slow Action (2010).

His father was sculptor David von Schlegell and his mother is poet Susan Howe. His siblings include painter R. H. Quaytman.

Writings
 Ickles, Ad Infinitum. New York: Inpatient Press, 2019.
 Ickles, Etc. Berlin: Sternberg Press. 2014.
 Dreaming the Mainstream: Tales of Yankee Power. Berlin: Merve. 2012.
 New Dystopia. Berlin: Sternberg Press. 2011 
 Mercury Station: a transit. Los Angeles: Semiotext(e). 2009. 
 High wichita. [Kbh.]: KBH Kunsthal. 2006. 
 Venusia Venusia: a true story. New York: Semiotext(e). 2005. 
 Realometer: uncovering discovery in American literature. Thesis (Ph. D.)-New York University, Graduate School of Arts and Science, 2000.

External links
MVS author site
bio at MIT Press
Interview on Strange Horizons
Merve Verlag site for Dreaming the Mainstream (German)
Review of Mercury Station in Bookforum by Jeff Vandermeer
"Melbourne Art fair 2012 Lecture Mark von Schlegell: Science fiction and contemporary art ."

References

American science fiction writers
American art critics
American male novelists
Living people
Year of birth missing (living people)